Lotte Capital Co, Ltd. is a Korean financial company, established in 1995 with headquarters in Seoul. It is the financial services unit of Lotte Corporation.

Affiliate

Lotte Group 
In September 2020, Lotte Group has spent 290 billion won to purchase Doosan Solus Co.

References

External links
  

Capital
Financial services companies of South Korea
Financial services companies established in 1995
South Korean companies established in 1995